Interstate 475 (I-475) is an auxiliary Interstate Highway in Ohio that is a  western bypass of Toledo. The southern terminus is I-75 exit 192 near Perrysburg. From the southern terminus to exit 14, I-475 is cosigned with US Route 23 (US 23) and is signed the north–south section of I-475. From exit 14 to the eastern (northernmost) terminus at I-75 exit 204 in central Toledo (north of downtown), it is signed the east–west section of I-475.

Although I-475 crosses I-80/I-90 (the Ohio Turnpike), there is no interchange and one must drive a couple of miles through surface streets between I-475 exit 6 and I-80/I-90 exit 59.

I-475 is named the Rosa Parks Highway in honor of Rosa Parks, who had helped organize the Montgomery bus boycott.

Route description

I-475 is a half-beltway bypassing Downtown Toledo on its western side as mostly a north–south segment and a largely east–west segment on the north side of Toledo. It has almost a half-square shape on the map consisting of the top and left sides of the square.

I-475 parallels what was US 23 on its north–south segment (US 23 has been realigned to it); it has Ann Arbor, Michigan, as a control city northbound (via US 23) and Columbus and Dayton as control cities southbound; it reaches neither of the three cities. On its northern segment it parallels State Route 120 (SR 120) and has Toledo as a control city to the east. Rural when built, it has much suburban-style development along its route.

It has no direct access to the Ohio Turnpike, access to which requires the use of either SR 2 to and from the west, I-75 to or from the east, or surface streets to US 20.

History
I-475 was opened in sections with the first opened in 1967 between US 20, at the current I–75 interchange near Perrysburg, and US 24, near Maumee. By 1969, the second portion opened between US 24 and US 23, near Sylvania. In this year, the southern terminus was moved from US 20, near Perrysburg, to the southern interchange with I–75. The final section opened in 1971 and was between US 23 and I-75 near Downtown Toledo.

Between 2010 and 2012, the easternmost sections of I-475 were reconstructed. This included the redevelopment of several overpasses, as well as the removal of an outdated interchange with Central Avenue in favor of an interchange with a newly constructed extension of ProMedica Parkway for easier access. Additional lanes were also added at the I-75/I-475 junction at I-475's eastern terminus.

Since July 2015, work has been ongoing along the western stretch of I-475 in Lucas County along its concurrency with US 23 to widen the freeway from two to three lanes in both directions to meet the needs of development in the western suburbs of Toledo. As part of this, two interchanges are being built and a preexisting one has been upgraded. The interchange with US 20 in Sylvania Township was upgraded from a partial cloverleaf interchange to a single-point urban interchange by November 2016. Interchanges at SR 246 and US 20 Alternate (US 20A) in Springfield Township and Maumee are under planning and construction, with the SR 246 interchange, a dumbbell interchange, opened on August 2, 2021, in time for the Solheim Cup. Construction on the US 20A interchange has not yet commenced as of July 2021. 

In Perrysburg, work was completed in late 2017 on upgrading the diamond interchange with SR 25 into a diverging diamond interchange.

Exit list

References

External links

 Interstate 475 (Ohio) Endpoint Photos
 Kurumi - Interstate 475 (Ohio)

75-4 Ohio
75-4
4 Ohio
Transportation in Wood County, Ohio
Transportation in Lucas County, Ohio